Andrea Adamo (born 23 April 1991) is an Italian footballer who plays for Italian Serie D club Sansepolcro.

Biography
Adamo started his career at Palermo. In August 2010 Adamo left for Reggiana. He was signed by Portogruaro in July 2011, in exchange for which the club received a subsidy of €20,000 from Palermo. On 29 June 2012 Adamo along with Francesco Vassallo were sold to Foligno in co-ownership deal, for a peppercorn of €500 each, but on 31 August 2012 Palermo bought back Vassallo by selling Adamo outright.

International career
Adamo received his first call-up in February 2009 from Italy national under-19 football team. The team in fact the same team with Italy national under-18 football team that season, as born 1990 team was eliminated from 2009 UEFA European Under-19 Football Championship qualification in October 2008. He did not play that match, but played the next match against Ukraine U19 (born 1990 squad) In April 2009 the same team had another fixture in Slovakia, but a U18 event. Adamo played all 3 matches of 2010 UEFA European Under-19 Football Championship qualification in November 2009, however he only played once in elite round in May 2010.

In the final tournament, Adamo started all 3 matches.

References

External links
 AIC.Football.it Profile 
 
 FIGC 
 

Italian footballers
Italy youth international footballers
Palermo F.C. players
A.C. Reggiana 1919 players
A.S.D. Portogruaro players
A.S.D. Città di Foligno 1928 players
Association football defenders
1991 births
Living people
People from Alcamo